The Jeff Nicklin Memorial Trophy is a trophy awarded to the Canadian Football League West Division's most outstanding player, chosen from the nominees from each team in the division. Either this trophy winner or the winner of the Terry Evanshen Trophy also receives the Canadian Football League Most Outstanding Player Award.

The Nicklin Memorial Trophy was donated to the Western Interprovincial Football Union in 1946 by the 1st Canadian Parachute Battalion, in memory of their commanding officer, Lieutenant-Colonel Jeff Nicklin, who was killed in action on March 24, 1945. Nicklin was known as an outstanding defensive end for the Winnipeg Blue Bombers before he entered military service.

When first donated, the trophy was awarded annually to the player in the Western Division considered to be the most valuable to his team. Since 1973, the trophy is awarded to the Most Outstanding Player of the West Division. As part of the failed American expansion in 1995, the trophy was awarded to the Most Outstanding Player of the North Division.

Jeff Nicklin Memorial Trophy winners (1946–1972)

Jeff Nicklin Memorial Trophy winners (1973–present)
Bold indicates a player who went on to win the CFL's Most Outstanding Player Award

Most Outstanding Player in the Western Interprovincial Football Union or Western Football Conference (1953–1972)
Note: Prior to 1973 the Canadian Football League West Division's Most Outstanding Player was not the winner of the Jeff Nicklin Memorial Trophy, which was a separate award.

Bold indicates a player who went on to win the CFL's Most Outstanding Player Award

References

External links
 Excerpt from JEFF NICKLIN: Hero of the Gridiron and the Battlefield film from The War Amps

Canadian Football League trophies and awards